Sean Lien or Lien Sheng-wen (Taiwanese: Liân sìng-bûn; born February 4, 1970) is a member of the Central Standing Committee of the Kuomintang of the Republic of China (Taiwan). He is co-founder of Evenstar Capital  and he previously served as chairman of the Taipei Smart Card Corporation, the company which operates EasyCard.

Family

Sean Lien is the eldest son of Lien Fang Yu and Lien Chan, who served as the Chairman of the Kuomintang party and was the Vice President of Taiwan. He is the grandson of Lien Chen-tung, and the great grandson of Lien Heng. He has a brother and two sisters. He is married to Patty Tsai.

According to some sources, he was born in the United States of America; others indicate that he was born in Taiwan.

Education

Lien studied law at Fu Jen Catholic University and at Columbia University School of Law. He was also an Eisenhower Fellow.

Early career
Lien served in a senior management position at GE's Asia Pacific Capital Fund II and as a vice president with an Investment Banking Group in Taipei.  He is co-founder and senior advisor to the Hong Kong investment company Evenstar Capital.

Political career

In 2008, Taipei City Mayor Hau Lung-pin appointed Lien as chairman of Taipei Smart Card Corporation. Lien resigned as Chairman of EasyCard Corporation at the end of 2009, citing health reasons. Assessments of his performance during this brief tenure differ.

During the municipal election on 26 November 2010, Lien was shot in the face at close range while stumping for Chen Hung-yuan, a New Taipei City Council candidate in the Yonghe District of New Taipei City. Lien's wound was minor and he recovered quickly. Lien disagrees with Taiwan judiciary's conclusion that he was shot by mistake.

On February 24, 2014, Lien announced his campaign for Taipei City mayor election; on April 19, 2014, he won the KMT mayoral primary. On November 29, Lien lost the race to independent candidate Ko Wen-je.

See also
 Lien Chan

References

1970 births
Columbia Law School alumni
Lien Heng family
Living people
Kuomintang politicians in Taiwan
Shooting survivors
Fu Jen Catholic University alumni
General Electric people
Taiwanese chief executives
Taiwanese company founders
20th-century Taiwanese businesspeople
21st-century Taiwanese businesspeople